Shahid Balkhi (or Shuhayd; ; died 927) was a scribe, philosopher and poet active in the Chaghaniyan and Samanid courts. He is notable being for one of the first composers of New Persian poetry.

Life 
The modern historian Francois de Blois has argued that the name of "Shahid" is a misrepresentation of chronicles, stating that during that period the name was only used as a posthumous title for Muslims that had been killed in battle, and thus using it for a living person "would seem ludicrous and indeed sacrilegious." He instead suggests that the proper transliteration is "Shuhayd", a name that has in few occasions been attested, and is a diminutive of shahd (honeycomb).

Shahid was born in Jakhudanak, a village near the city of Balkh, where his father later moved and raised him. Of Persian stock, Shahid was bilingual in his mother tongue as well as Arabic. Little is known about him. He was close friends with the polymath Abu Zayd al-Balkhi and the Mu'tazili theologian Abu'l-Qasim al-Balkhi. The three of them, all connected to Balkh, appear jointly in the Yatimatu'l-dahr of al-Tha'alibi and the Mu'jamu'l-udaba of Yaqut al-Hamawi. Based on this, de Blois suggests that Shahid may have been part of the somewhat pro-Shi'ite Mu'tazili environment of his two associates. An adept scribe, Shahid was well-known for his accurate copying skills.

Shahid died in 927.

Philosophy 
Shahid was a fierce opponent of Abu Bakr al-Razi, who was from the same philosophical background. Razi had studied under an obscure figure called "al-Balkhi", who may also have been Shahid's teacher, or regardless whose philosophical system Shahid adhered to. Razi is known to have written two polemics (about pleasure and eschatology, respectively) against Shahid. The Siwanu'l-hikma of Abu Sulayman Sijistani contains a large excerpt from one of Shahid's books about the "superiority of the pleasures of the soul over those of the body", which may have been what Razi addressed in one of his polemics.

Poetry 
Shahid also wrote poetry in Arabic, including two qit'as that ridicules Ahmad ibn Abi Rabi'a, who served as the vizier of the Saffarid ruler Amr ibn al-Layth between 891–900. Shahid wrote a similar poem about the governor Ahmad ibn Sahl, a distinguished governor in Khurasan. This led to Shahid's flight from the angry governor, first returning to Balkh after Ahmad's execution in 920. Shahid is best known for being one of the first composers of New Persian poetry. More or less 100 of his verses have survived in the accounts of anthologists and lexicographers. These contain an erotic poem of eight lines, a portion of a qasida written for the Samanid amir (ruler) Nasr II, a poem that uses shifts between Persian and Arabic verses, and a number of couplets from a poem of a story, supposedly romantic-related. A number of the surviving verses mentioned in the dictionaries have a gnomic or philosophical tone. Some of his lines have been hypothesized to have subtle references to the religion of Manichaeism.

Legacy 
Shahid's close friend and teacher in poetry, Rudaki (died 941), dedicated an elegy to him;

Persian poets between the 10th and 12th-centuries mention Shahid in an respectful manner, but after that he fades into obscurity. The modern historian N. N. Negmatov calls Shahid "one of the best court poets of the Samanid Nasr II, and one of the leading scholars of the age." In the Prison Feats masnavi of the modern Iranian poet Mohammad-Taqi Bahar, several historical and fictional anecdotes of historical figures are used, including Shahid. The same work also narrates a fictional scene, where Bahar meets Shahid.

References

Sources 
  
 
 
 
 
 
  
 

927 deaths
10th-century Persian-language poets
Year of birth unknown
10th-century Iranian philosophers
Samanid-period poets